The First War of the Guelderian Succession was a battle for the throne of the Duchy of Guelders that raged between 1371 and 1379.

The war originated when Duke Reginald III died without issue in 1371. His brother, Edward, who had been killed in the Battle of Baesweiler earlier that same year, also left no offspring. The claimants to the ducal throne were their half-sisters: Matilda, who was married to John II, Count of Blois, and Maria, wife of William II of Jülich and mother to William I of Guelders and Jülich, on whose behalf she claimed the throne of Guelders.

14th-century Guelders was divided in two factions:

 The Heeckerens supported Matilda, and were led by Frederik van Heeckeren van der Eze (1320-1386).
 The Bronckhorsters supported William, and were led by Gijsbert V van Bronckhorst (1328-1356).

The war lasted eight years, with Maria and her supporters emerging victorious, and Maria's son William becoming duke.

Timeline 

 1372 The Bronckhorst faction carries out raids in the Sticht Utrecht, presumably because the bishop of Utrecht Arnold II of Horne had joined their enemies. In the Battle near Heerewaarden, the Bronckhorst faction is defeated.
 1372, Gozewijn van Varik, cousin of Matilda and Maria, conquers Tiell in the spring of this year. Throughout the year, struggles continue within the city.
 1372/73, troops of Arnold II of Horne  conquer Harderwijk on behalf of Matilda.
 1373, Matilda's husband, Count John II of Blois, begins his Siege of Venlo.
 1374, Reinoud I van Brederode conquers Tiel on behalf of Matilda.
 1376, the leaders of the Bronckhorst faction are ambushed and taken as prisoners near Oosterbeek.
 1377,  Emperor Charles IV assigns the duchy to the son of Maria.
 1378,  Battle of Tiel.
 1378, In the Battle near Gennep the Heeckeren and Bronckhorst factions confront each other.
 1379, The village of Zennuwijnen with its church and abbey are destroyed by the Bronckhorst faction.
 1379, On March 24 the last battle was fought near Hönnepel. Matilda was defeated by the troops of Julich and resigned her rights to the duchy.

Duchy of Guelders
Guelders
14th century in the Netherlands
Wars involving the Holy Roman Empire
1370s conflicts
1370s in Europe